Harry Melvin Rose (born May 30, 1906 in Niles, Ohio; died November 4, 1986 in Meredith, New Hampshire) was a microbiologist whose lab developed an accurate diagnostic test for rheumatoid arthritis in 1948 after Erik Waaler. He was among the first recipients of the Gairdner Foundation International Award for the test. He lived in Sandwich, New Hampshire.

References 

Columbia University faculty
Members of the United States National Academy of Sciences
People from Niles, Ohio
American microbiologists
1906 births
1986 deaths
People from Sandwich, New Hampshire
Weill Cornell Medical College alumni